Starr, or starra, was a term used in pre-fourteenth century England for the contract or obligation of a Jew.  It derives from the Hebrew  (shtar, "document").

By an ordinance of Richard I, no English starr was valid unless deposited in one of certain repositories, the best-known of which was the King's exchequer at Westminster.  It was once speculated that the room where these were kept became known as the "starr-chamber" as a result, although this theory is dismissed by the Oxford English Dictionary.

See also
 Exchequer of the Jews
 Star Chamber

References

English contract law
Jewish English history
Medieval English law